Thompson High School is a high school located in the city of Alabaster, Alabama.

History 
In the early 1920s, Shelby County Schools had determined there was enough population in the northwestern area of Shelby County to create a high school. The new school was selected to be in the small community of Siluria. There had already been an existing junior high school and elementary school in the community, that now fed into the high school. The new school named Thompson High School served the communities of Siluria, Shelbyville (now Pelham), Helena, Brantleyville, Maylene, Saginaw, and several other small communities/unincorporated areas through the early times of the school's existence. The school was named after Thomas Carlyle Thompson, who donated the land and most of the funds to build the original high school building which is where the intermediate center is currently located.

Thompson High School's first official school day was October 3, 1921. The first "school bus" provided to THS was a covered wagon pulled by two mules and owned by a local man named Mr. Faust. From the 1920s to the 1950s, the school was a quiet country school, nothing major happened apart from the school not fielding a football team during World War II from 1942-1945. In 1951, the original high school buildings burned down with nothing to salvage, leading to the construction of a new high school. The 1952 THS building was then built, which is still standing as Thompson Intermediate School.

The 1950s and early 1960s didn't see much action with the community or school, however by the late 1960s and early 1970s the school's hometown of Siluria was being rapidly outpaced by the newer city of Alabaster, which annexed Siluria in 1971. This made Thompson synonymous to the city of Alabaster, which it still is to this day. The late 1970s and 1980s saw a major increase in enrollment, as many people were leaving the city of Birmingham for communities south of the city. The first attempt of reducing enrollment led Shelby County Schools to create a new zone for Pelham and Helena, creating Pelham High School in 1973. This was Thompson's major rival in multiple sports, they played a football game every year until 2017. This reduction only held the growing population for so long, with the 1952 school soon reached design capacity, leading to the construction of a new high school in 1987. This building is now Thompson Middle School after the high school was moved a few decades later. Alabaster continued to grow along with communities surrounding, making Thompson one of the largest schools in the 1990s and 2000s.

By 2011, the City of Alabaster had determined they wanted to create a city school system and bring Thompson with it. The school system was completely split on July 1, 2013 being a part of Alabaster City Schools. This split happened near the same time Pelham City Schools became independent on July 1, 2014. This allowed Shelby County Schools time to readjust school zones and set up new zoning for Helena High School which split Pelham's student body. Some communities such as Saginaw and Brantleyville could no longer attend Thompson as the school system was zoned for city limits only. A new rush of people began coming into Alabaster and Pelham after hearing the schools had become independent, now overwhelming the 1987 building which was originally designed for 800 students, but housed 1900 in its last year as a high school. A new 360,000 square foot building was soon built on 300 acres of land, the first day for students was February 26, 2018. The school is easily identifiable by the front rotunda and water fountain. Since the construction of the new school, Thompson has seen renewed interest in athletics funding, now primarily dominating the football scene.

Athletics 
The school mascot is the Warriors. The school colors are red, white, and black. Thompson has approximately 2,000 students. It participates in 7A level sports in Alabama. The school's wrestling team, established in 2007, won five state titles in a row (four 6A & one 7A) from 2011 to 2016. The wrestling team won its sixth state title in 2018 (7A).

The Thompson High School Football team went 12–1 during the 2017 season; defeating Hoover High School to win the 7A Region 3 championship. The Warriors fell in the semi-finals against Hoover High School that year. The following year in 2018, Thompson's football team advanced to the AHSAA 7A Finals for the first time in over three decades. In 2019, the Warriors went 12-1 and advanced to the AHSAA 7A Finals were they beat the Central-Phenix High School Red Devils 40–14, giving Thompson their first football state championship since 1983.  Since 2019 Thompson has won four 7A state titles in a row defeating Auburn High School in 2020 and Central-Phenix City again in 2021, completing the very rare 4-peat championship run by defeating Auburn again in 2022.

The 2019 fall eSports season was the first for Thompson, and the Warriors went all the way to the finals to face off against Bob Jones High School for the AHSAA League of Legends State Championship. The Warriors lost the first match, but came back and won two straight to win the title.

State Championships 
Football: 1982 (3A), 2019 (7A), 2020 (7A), 2021 (7A), 2022 (7A)

Wrestling: 2011 (6A), 2012 (6A), 2013 (6A), 2014 (6A), 2015 (7A), 2018 (7A), 2019 (7A), 2020 (7A), 2022 (7A) 

Boys Basketball: 1976 (3A), 1977 (3A)

Boys Bowling: 2020 (6A/7A)

Softball: 1998 (5A/4A), 1999 (6A), 2022 (7A) 

Volleyball: 1979 (3A), 1981 (3A), 1982 (3A)

E-Sports: 2019, 2020, 2021 (No classification)

New high school building 
In 2018, Alabaster City Schools opened the new Thompson High School, the second biggest high school in the state of Alabama (behind Enterprise High School). The new, state-of-the-art school totals , and includes: dedicated classrooms for each academy, a 2,500-seat arena-style gymnasium, an auxiliary gym, new baseball and softball facilities, tennis courts, competition track and a 5,300 seat football and soccer stadium, which houses an indoor practice facility.

Notable alumni
 Jim Davenport, former MLB player (San Francisco Giants)
 Noah Galloway, Dancing with the Stars contestant, United States Army veteran and double amputee, motivational speaker
 Brandon King, NFL defensive player (New England Patriots), 2x Super Bowl Champion
 Rebecca Luker, Broadway actress
 Taulia Tagovailoa, college quarterback (University of Maryland), brother of Tua Tagovailoa

References

External links 
 Thompson High School

Public high schools in Alabama
Schools in Shelby County, Alabama
Educational institutions established in 1921
1921 establishments in Alabama